Deeper is the third full-length studio album by American post-punk band the Soft Moon. It was released on March 31, 2015 by Captured Tracks.

First single "Black" was featured as a Best New Track by Pitchfork, and was used in the television series Gotham and How to Get Away With Murder. Million Dollar Extreme'''s Adult Swim television series also used "Try" as the ending song to the episode "Illegal Broadcast: John Hell Emergency".

Critical reception

Lisa Sookraj of Exclaim!'' called the record a more polished release that is "fuller, fatter and puts more emphasis on its futuristic electronic elements than its nostalgic ones."

Track listing

Personnel
Adapted from CD liner notes and AllMusic.
 Maurizio Baggio – production, mixing, mastering (at Hate Studio, Vicenza, Italy), co-writer for "Wrong"
 Luis Vasquez – composition, performance, production, audio engineer

References

2015 albums
Captured Tracks albums
The Soft Moon albums